Puri–Kamakhya Weekly Express (via- Howrah) is an Express train of the Indian Railways connecting  in Odisha and   in Guwahati, Assam, via , ,  . It is currently being operated with 15643/15644 train numbers on once in week basis.

Service

The 15643/Puri–Kamakhya Weekly Express has an average speed of 48 km/hr and covers 1521 km in 31 hrs 55 mins. 15644/Kamakhya–Puri Weekly Express has an average speed of 48 km/hr and covers 1521 km in 31 hrs 45 mins.

Traction
From  to  the train is hauled by WAP-4 Locomotive of Electric Loco Shed, Howrah.

Route and halts 

The important halts of the train are :

ODISHA
 
  
 
  
 WEST BENGAL 
  
 
 
 
 
 
 
    
 BIHAR 
 ASSAM 
 
 Goalpara Town
 '''

Coach composition

The train consists of 17 coaches:
 1 AC II Tier
 2 AC III Tier
 8 Sleeper coaches
 4 General
 2 Second-class Luggage/parcel van

See also 
Kamakhya Junction railway station
Puri railway station
Puri–Kamakhya Weekly Express (via Adra)
Paharia Express

References

External links 

 15643/Puri - Kamakhya Weekly Express India Rail Info
 15644/Kamakhya - Puri Weekly Express India Rail Info

Transport in Guwahati
Transport in Puri
Railway services introduced in 2010
Rail transport in Assam
Rail transport in West Bengal
Rail transport in Odisha
Express trains in India